Bobby Lamont Clark (born 7 February 2005) is an English footballer who plays as a forward for Liverpool.

Early life
Clark trained with the academy at Birmingham City when his father, Lee Clark, was the manager there. The family moved back to the north east of England in 2014. After visiting all the clubs in the area Clark chose to join the academy at Newcastle United.

Career
Clark moved to the academy of Liverpool from Newcastle United in August 2021. The fee was thought to be for a total
including add-ons of £1.5 million.
He agreed a professional contract with the club shortly after his seventeenth birthday in February 2022. The contract was for five years and came with personal guarantee from Liverpool the first team manager Jurgen Klopp that there would be a pathway to the first team available to him. 

Featuring for the Liverpool under-18 side in the 2021-22 season Clark scored 13 goals in 23 matches. He also made his debut for the Liverpool side that competes in the Premier League 2. In the summer of 2022, Clark went with the Liverpool first team squad on their trip to Asia for matches in Thailand and Singapore. Clark has featured as part of BBC Sport website Wonderkids feature, and was identified in August 2022 as one of “Five young English footballers to watch out for” on their website.

Clark was an unused substitute for Liverpool's first home game of the 2022-23 Premier League season, against Crystal Palace F.C.  at Anfield. On 27 August, 2022 Clark made his professional debut appearing as a substitute for Liverpool against AFC Bournemouth in a 9-0 home victory at Anfield.

On 9 November 2022, he started his first game for Liverpool in the win against Derby County in the third round of the EFL Cup at Anfield.

International career
Clark made his debut for England national under-16 football team against Wales U16 in April 2021.

On 21 September 2022, Clark made his  England U18 debut during a 1-0 win over the  Netherlands in Pinatar.

Career statistics

References

External links
 

2005 births
Living people
Sportspeople from Epsom
English footballers
England youth international footballers
Liverpool F.C. players
Premier League players
Association football midfielders
Association football wingers